The Iran men's national water polo team represents Iran in men's international water polo competitions and is controlled by the IR Iran Amateur Swimming Federation.

Tournament records

Olympic Games
 1976 – 12th place

World Championships
 1975 – 15th place
 1998 – 15th place

World Cup
 2010 – 8th place

World League
 2008 – Round 1
 2009 – Round 1
 2010 – Round 1

FINA Development Trophy
 2007 –  Bronze Medal
 2011 –  Silver Medal
 2015 –  Gold Medal
 2017 – Disqualified

Asian Games

 1970 – 4th place
 1974 –  Gold Medal
 1986 – 4th place
 1990 – 6th place
 1994 – 4th place
 1998 – 5th place
 2002 – 4th place
 2006 – 4th place
 2018 –  Bronze Medal

Asian Championships 
 1984 –  Bronze Medal
 1991 – 5th place
 1995 –  Bronze Medal
 2015 – 4th place
 2016 – 4th place
 2022 – 4th place

Asian Cup
 2010 –  Silver Medal
 2012 –  Bronze Medal
 2013 –  Gold Medal

Islamic Solidarity Games 
 2005 – 4th place
 2017 –  Silver Medal

Former coaches 
  Nico Firoiu (1969–71, 1972–74)
  Ante Nakić
  Neven Kovačević
  Stanislav Pivovarov (2010)
  Paolo Malara (2011)
  Roman Poláčik (2011–2012)
  Paolo Malara (2013–2014)
  Sirous Taherian (2014--2016)

References 

 https://web.archive.org/web/20131112163610/http://www.asiaswimmingfederation.org/competitions.php?discipline=2

External links
Islamic Republic of Iran Swimming Federation

 
Men's national water polo teams
National water polo teams in Asia
National water polo teams by country
Water
Men's sport in Iran